"Feliz Navidad" is a Christmas song written and first recorded in 1970 by Puerto Rican singer-songwriter José Feliciano. With its simple, heartfelt lyrics - the traditional Spanish Christmas/New Year greeting "Feliz Navidad, próspero año y felicidad" ("Merry Christmas, a prosperous year and happiness"), followed by text in English words "I wanna wish you a Merry Christmas from the bottom of my heart" - it has become a Christmas classic and has gained popularity around the world.

Background and composition
Feliciano says he recorded the song while feeling homesick at Christmas, missing his family in New York City and his extended family further afield as he sat in a studio in Los Angeles. He remembered celebrating Christmas Eve with his brothers, eating traditional Puerto Rican foods, drinking rum, and going caroling. "It was expressing the joy that I felt on Christmas and the fact that I felt very lonely," he told NPR in December 2020. "I missed my family, I missed Christmas carols with them. I missed the whole Christmas scene."

Chart performance
Feliciano's 1970 recording of "Feliz Navidad" (in which he plays both an acoustic guitar and a Puerto Rican cuatro) is one of the most downloaded and aired Christmas songs in the United States and Canada. As of November 25, 2016, total sales of the digital track stand at 808,000 downloads according to Nielsen SoundScan, placing it eighth on the list of all-time best-selling Christmas/holiday digital singles in SoundScan history. It was also recognized by ASCAP as one of the top 25 most played and recorded Christmas songs around the world.

The original version of "Feliz Navidad" did not enter any of the US Billboard music popularity charts until well over two-and-a-half decades after it was recorded, first on the Adult Contemporary chart on the week ending January 3, 1998 (reaching No. 18), and then on the Radio Songs chart the following week (reaching No. 70). Two years later, on the week ending January 8, 2000, the song re-entered the Billboard Adult Contemporary chart at a new peak of No. 12.

Nearly two decades later, "Feliz Navidad" entered the main Billboard Hot 100 songs chart for the first time, specifically on the week ending January 7, 2017 at No. 44. On the week ending December 22, 2018, the song re-charted on the Hot 100 at No. 42, and the following week became Feliciano's first top 40 hit since 1968 by climbing to No. 34. Two years later, and just two weeks after re-entering the Hot 100 chart at No. 45 on the week ending December 5, 2020, "Feliz Navidad" made the top 10 for the first time (at No. 10), becoming Feliciano's first top 10 hit on the Hot 100 chart since his cover of The Doors' "Light My Fire" peaked at No. 3 in August 1968. Two weeks later, "Feliz Navidad" climbed to an all-time chart peak position of No. 6 on the Hot 100.

Other versions
In 2017, Feliciano released a ska version of "Feliz Navidad" in collaboration with English musician Jools Holland.

Charts

Certifications

Other recordings
In 1980, the song was recorded in Estonian by Apelsin with lyrics by Henno Käo; however, this cover, titled "See viis", is not intended as a Christmas song. The lyrics describe the singer falling in love with someone over a song that they sing, but not being able to remember anything about the song but the melody. 

In 1981, the Euro-Caribbean dance group Boney M. included a cover in their Christmas Album. This version remained an airplay favourite in the festive season throughout the decades in Europe, reaching no. 32 in the official Spanish Single Chart. Although it has never been released as a single in the US, the cover also entered the Billboard Holiday Airplay chart reaching peak position no. 44 in 2017.

In 2002, Nick Jr.'s animated TV cartoon Dora the Explorer featured a cover of the song in the Christmas-themed episode, "A Present for Santa", as sung by Dora, Boots, Santa Claus (voiced by Howie Dorough from Backstreet Boys), and all the elves.

In 2011, Canadian singer Michael Bublé recorded a cover medley of the song titled Mis Deseos/Felíz Navidad featuring Mexican singer Thalía for his album Christmas. Their version entered several Latin and Holiday charts on Billboard. Their version also entered charts in European countries like Belgium and Hungary.

In 2013, American Christian pop band Unspoken recorded a cover of the song with new verses.

"Feliz Navidad" was recorded by Finnish symphonic metal artist Tarja Turunen in 2017, for her Christmas album From Spirits and Ghosts (Score for a Dark Christmas). On December 6, 2017, a music video was released for the solo version of the song. A special version was released as a single on December 8, featuring Turunen's musician friends Michael Monroe, Doro Pesch, Tony Kakko, Elize Ryd, Marko Saaresto, Timo Kotipelto, Simone Simons, Cristina Scabbia, Joe Lynn Turner, Floor Jansen, Hansi Kürsch and Sharon den Adel. The ensemble version was released as a benefit single to benefit victims of Hurricane Irma on the Caribbean island of Barbuda.

In 2020, Thalía released a merengue version of the song. It debuted at number 17 on the Monitor Latino Pop Charts in the Dominican Republic. On its second week the song moved up to the number 6 spot on that chart with that being its peak position.

Parodies
In December 2009, a parody of "Feliz Navidad" titled "The Illegal Alien Christmas Song" was created by radio producers Matt Fox and A. J. Rice and posted on the website for Human Events, a Washington-based weekly publication. This parody, sung in English, played on the stereotype of Mexican immigrants as heavy drinkers and that illegal immigrants were going to "spread bubonic plague". Feliciano released a statement on December 23 on his official website:

In a statement to the Associated Press the same day, Jed Babbin, Human Events site editor, apologized for "any offense that Mr. Feliciano may have taken from this parody" and removed it from the site.

Bob Rivers wrote and recorded a parody called "Police Stop My Car," about driving under the influence, which appeared on his album More Twisted Christmas.

References

1970 singles
1970 songs
José Feliciano songs
American Christmas songs
Gwen Stefani songs
1910 Fruitgum Company songs
Spanglish songs
Edel AG singles
RCA Victor singles